Cause and Effect is the first studio album by alternative metal band Digital Summer. It was released on March 8, 2007, and features the single "Whatever it Takes".

Track listing

Miscellaneous information 
 The song, "Whatever It Takes", was played in regular rotation on several major market radio stations, including 98KUPD Phoenix, Arizona, Rock1061 in Savannah, Georgia, Banana 1015 in Flint, Michigan, and Octane 20 on Sirius Satellite Radio.
 The songs, "Disconnect", "Whatever It Takes", and "Suffocate", were featured in the off-road video All Crossed Up.
 "Chasing Tomorrow" was featured in an animation project by Adam Sabo for the Art Institute of Phoenix
 "Suffocate" was used in the soundtrack of the independent horror film Blood Guardian.

Personnel 
 Kyle Winterstein - Vocals, guitar, producer
 Ian Winterstein - Guitar
 Johnmark Cenfield - Guitar
 Anthony Hernandez- Bass
 Chris Carlson - Drums
 Larry Elyea, Mind's Eye Digital - producer, engineer

References 

2007 debut albums
Digital Summer albums